The Zealand Artillery Regiment was an artillery regiment of the Royal Danish Army. On 1 August 1982 it was merged with Kronens Artilleriregiment to form Kongens Artilleriregiment.

History
In 1803 the Danish artillery corps was split into three Brigades, Holstenske Artilleribrigade, Danske Artilleribrigade and Norske Artilleribrigade (disbanded in 1814). The Regiment traces its history back to Holstenske Artilleribrigade. In the First Schleswig War the Regiment (then named 2. Artilleriregiment) participated on the Schleswig-Holstein side and was afterwards disbanded.

Units
  4th Rocket Artillery Battalion (1961-1976) 
  5th Armoured Artillery Battalion (1961-1982)
  21st Light Artillery Battalion (1961-1982)
  22nd Light Artillery Battalion (1961-1982)
  32nd Heavy Artillery Battalion (1961-1982)

Names of the regiment

References
 Lærebog for Hærens Menige, Hærkommandoen, marts 1960

Artillery regiments of Denmark
Military units and formations established in 1803
Military units and formations disestablished in 1982